Michael Francis O'Halloran (born 6 January 1991) is a Scottish footballer who plays for Cove Rangers, on loan from St Johnstone.

Born in Glasgow, he began his professional career with English club Bolton Wanderers, but made only made two appearances in three seasons. While at Bolton he had loan spells with Sheffield United, Carlisle United and Tranmere Rovers. After two years with St Johnstone, he moved to Rangers in January 2016.

O'Halloran returned to St Johnstone on loan in July 2017. After a short spell with Australian club Melbourne City, he returned to St Johnstone for a third spell in January 2019.

O'Halloran represented Scotland at various youth levels, up to and including the under-21 level.

Club career

Bolton Wanderers
O'Halloran started his professional career at Bolton Wanderers, regularly playing in the reserve side. A product of the youth system, he made his début in the League Cup tie at home to Macclesfield Town on 24 August 2011, coming on as a second-half substitute for Martin Petrov. His form in the reserves prompted Bolton to offer both O'Halloran and Joe Riley new three and a half-year contracts, committing them to the club until the summer of 2015. In March 2012, O'Halloran joined Sheffield United on loan until the end of the season, and made his début for the Blades on as an 81st-minute substitute against Chesterfield in a 4–1 victory at Bramall Lane. O'Halloran was in and out of the side for the remainder of his spell, with his final appearance for the Blades coming at Wembley for the League One play-off final in which he came on as a substitute in extra time. O'Halloran scored in the game's penalty shoot out but United slipped to defeat.

In August 2012, O'Halloran joined Carlisle United on a month's loan. However, after playing just one game, a substitute appearance against MK Dons, O'Halloran opted to return to Bolton, his loan only lasting 12 days. O'Halloran then joined Tranmere Rovers on loan on in November of the same year. O'Halloran scored the first professional goal of his career on 8 December as he scored in a 2–2 draw against Portsmouth, O'Halloran loan was extended by a further month on 7 January 2013, and then again until the end of the season on January deadline day.

St Johnstone
After appearing in just two cup matches in three years at Bolton, O'Halloran made the move back to his native Scotland with St Johnstone in January 2014, signing an 18-month contract with the club. O'Halloran made his debut, coming on as a substitute, in a 1–0 win over Partick Thistle. Then on 8 February 2014, O'Halloran scored his first goal in the fifth round of Scottish Cup, in a 4–0 win over Forfar Athletic. He scored again in Saints' final home game of the season, to conclude a 3–3 draw with former club Celtic.

O'Halloran won the Scottish Premiership player of the month award for November 2015. St Johnstone rejected two bids from Rangers for O'Halloran in January 2016. Manager Tommy Wright then left O'Halloran out of their following league game, saying that O'Halloran was not "mentally ready" to play. O'Halloran made his final appearance for the club in a 2–1 defeat to Hibernian in the Scottish League Cup semi final at Tynecastle.

Rangers
On 1 February 2016, after much speculation, O'Halloran signed a four and a half-year deal with the then Scottish Championship club Rangers for a fee reported to be £500,000. He made his debut for the Ibrox club as a substitute in a 1–0 victory against Raith Rovers at Stark's Park on 2 February 2016. He scored his first goal for the club in a 1–1 draw with Alloa Athletic on 13 February 2016. He picked up a winners' medal in the 2016 Scottish Challenge Cup Final at Hampden Park after defeating Peterhead 4–0 on 10 April 2016 and helped Rangers win promotion to the Scottish Premiership.

O'Halloran fell out of favour during the 2016–17 season, playing mainly as a substitute. He returned to St Johnstone on loan in July 2017. On his first appearance back at the club, he scored the winning goal in a 2–1 victory away to Kilmarnock. After scoring four goals in his first five appearances back at the club, O'Halloran won the Scottish Premiership Player of the month award for August.

Melbourne City
O'Halloran signed a two-year contract with Australian club Melbourne City in June 2018. O'Halloran had played in the same youth team as Australian international Aaron Mooy, who recommended the move to him. He stayed at the club for only six months, being released by the club on 8 January 2019 on compassionate grounds.

St Johnstone (second spell)
O'Halloran returned to Scotland in January 2019, re-signing for St Johnstone for a second time.

Cove Rangers (loan) 
On 24 February 2023, O'Halloran joined Scottish Championship club Cove Rangers on loan until the end of the season.

International career
O'Halloran represented Scotland at various age levels up to the under-21 team. He made his Scotland under-21 debut on 29 February 2012, appearing as a substitute in a 0–0 draw with the Netherlands.

Personal life
O'Halloran's father, Michael senior, is a youth coach at Old Firm rivals Celtic. Although he never coached his son.

Career statistics

Honours

Club
St Johnstone
Scottish Cup: 2013–14, 2020–21
Scottish League Cup: 2020–21

Rangers
Scottish Championship: 2015–16
Scottish Challenge Cup: 2015–16

Individual
Scottish Premiership Player of the Month: November 2015, August 2017

References

External links

Scotland Stats at Scottish FA

1991 births
Living people
Footballers from Glasgow
Scottish footballers
Association football forwards
Celtic F.C. players
Bolton Wanderers F.C. players
Sheffield United F.C. players
Carlisle United F.C. players
Tranmere Rovers F.C. players
St Johnstone F.C. players
Scotland youth international footballers
Scotland under-21 international footballers
English Football League players
Rangers F.C. players
Scottish expatriate footballers
Expatriate soccer players in Australia
Melbourne City FC players
A-League Men players
Scottish expatriate sportspeople in Australia
Cove Rangers F.C. players